Naret Sukngam (born December 6, 1976) is a member of the Thailand national beach soccer team.

External links
Thailand Beach Soccer Team
Thailand Squad On Fifa.com

Living people
1976 births
Naret Sukngam
Naret Sukngam